Kelvin Kay Droegemeier (born September 23, 1958) is an American research meteorologist, most recently having served as Director of The White House Office of Science and Technology Policy. Droegemeier is known for his research in predicting the development of extreme weather events, and previously served as  Oklahoma Secretary of Science and Technology and the Vice President for Research at the University of Oklahoma.  He currently is serving as Regents Professor of Meteorology, Roger and Sherry Teigen Presidential Professor, and Weathernews Chair Emeritus at the University of Oklahoma.

Academic career 
Droegemeier was born on September 23, 1958 in Ellsworth, Kansas.  He received a B.S. in meteorology from the University of Oklahoma in 1980. He then pursued graduate studies in atmospheric science at the University of Illinois at Urbana–Champaign, earning an M.S. in 1982 and a Ph.D. in 1985.  In 1985 he joined the faculty of the University of Oklahoma.

Droegemeier's academic research has focused on extreme weather events.  In the 1990s, he became known for research on computer simulations of thunderstorm development, drawing on advancements in both radar and computer technology.

He went on to co-found two centers of the National Science Foundation: the Center for Analysis and Prediction of Storms in 1989, and the Engineering Research Center for Collaborative Adaptive Sensing of the Atmosphere in 2003.  He also founded and directed the Sasaki Institute, a now-defunct non-profit organization at the University of Oklahoma. In 2000 he started a weather technology company.  Droegemeier became Vice President for Research at the University of Oklahoma in 2009, and held this position until August 2018.

At the conclusion of his appointment at OSTP, Droegemeier returned to the University of Oklahoma, where he serves as Regents Professor of Meteorology, Roger and Sherry Teigen Presidential Professor, and Weathernews Chair Emeritus.

Political appointments 

Droegemeier served on the National Science Board for 12 years during the George W. Bush and Obama administrations beginning in 2004, including as Vice Chairman during 2012–2016.  He was appointed Oklahoma Secretary of Science and Technology in March 2017.

In August 2018, Droegemeier was nominated to be the Director of the Office of Science and Technology Policy (OSTP).  The position had been vacant since January 2017.  He was noted for being a strong supporter of federally funded research.  Droegemeier would be the first OSTP Director who is not a physicist. Reaction to the nomination from the scientific community was generally positive.  Previous OSTP Director John Holdren called the nomination "a solid choice", and American Association for the Advancement of Science CEO and former Democratic Congressman Rush Holt expressed approval of the nomination. On September 5, 2018, the Senate Committee on Commerce, Science and Transportation voted unanimously to approve Droegemeier's nomination. Droegemeier was confirmed by the Senate on January 2, 2019, the final day of the 115th United States Congress. He was sworn in officially on January 11, 2019 and then ceremonially by Vice President Mike Pence on February 11, 2019.

On March 1, 2020, Vice President Pence and Health and Human Services Secretary Alex Azar announced the addition of Droegemeier to the White House Coronavirus Task Force. Effective March 31, 2020, he was named Acting Director of the National Science Foundation following the end of France A. Córdova's term.

Droegemeier returned to his professorships at the University of Oklahoma when President Trump left office in January 2021.

References

External links 

  at the University of Oklahoma
 

1958 births
20th-century American scientists
21st-century American scientists
American meteorologists
Living people
People from Ellsworth, Kansas
Scientists from Kansas
State cabinet secretaries of Oklahoma
Trump administration personnel
United States National Science Foundation officials
University of Illinois Urbana-Champaign alumni
University of Oklahoma alumni
University of Oklahoma faculty
Directors of the Office of Science and Technology Policy